This is a list of notable Southern University alumni.

Athletes

Entertainers and personalities

Politicians, judges and public officials

Military commanders

Academics

References

 
Southern University alumni